Eric Carson is a New Zealand former rugby league footballer who represented New Zealand in the 1968 World Cup.

Playing career
Carson played for the Glenora Bears in the Auckland Rugby League competition. He represented Auckland and was part of the sides that lost to France in 1964 and defeated Australia in 1969. He won the Rothville Trophy in 1969 as the Auckland Rugby League's Player of the Year.

In 1968 he was selected in the New Zealand national rugby league team squad for the 1968 World Cup in Australia and New Zealand. He again played for New Zealand in 1970 during the tour of Great Britain.

In 1971 Carson moved to Wellington, joining St. George and captaining the club in the Wellington Rugby League competition.

References

Living people
New Zealand rugby league players
New Zealand national rugby league team players
Auckland rugby league team players
Glenora Bears players
Rugby league halfbacks
St. George Saints players
Year of birth missing (living people)